Bernard Francis "Mike" Kelly (May 1, 1896October 23, 1968) was an American baseball player, coach and manager.

Career

Player
Kelly made his playing debut in 1916 for St Mary's in the Interstate League. He played one season there before moving in 1917 to the Central League team South Bend/Peoria Benders/Distillers. He again lasted one year before moving to Toledo in the American Association. He played at Toledo until 1920.

Player/manager
In 1921, Kelly began his management career at the Spartanburg Pioneers while still a player.

A year later, he moved to the Spartanburg Spartans in the South Atlantic League and, between 1922 and 1929, played and managed the Spartans where he won a league championship in 1925.

Coach and manager
After retiring as a player, Kelly coached for the Chicago White Sox between 1930 and 1931.

In 1931 Kelly left the White Sox to coach the Newark Bears.

Kelly managed the Jersey City Skeeters in 1933.

In 1934, he moved to the Chicago Cubs where he was a coach.

Between 1936 and 1937, Kelly managed the Syracuse Chiefs.

He later coached with the Boston Braves and Pittsburgh Pirates.

In 1944, he managed the Indianapolis Indians in the American Association.

Scout
Between 1948 and 1950, he was a scout for the Pittsburgh Pirates.

References

1896 births
1968 deaths
Baseball players from Indiana
Toledo Mud Hens players
Chicago Cubs coaches
Chicago White Sox coaches
Boston Braves coaches
Pittsburgh Pirates coaches
Pittsburgh Pirates scouts
Indianapolis Indians managers
Syracuse Chiefs managers